Rita Cosby (born November 18, 1964) is a television news anchor and correspondent, radio host, and best selling author. She is currently a special correspondent for the CBS syndicated program Inside Edition, specializing in interviewing newsmakers and political figures. Cosby has received three Emmy Awards, the Jack Anderson Award for investigative excellence, the Matrix Award, the Ellis Island Medal of Honor, and the Lech Walesa Freedom Award.  October 11, 2010, was declared "Rita Cosby Day" in the State of New York for her “extraordinary journalism and exemplary service on behalf of her community.”

Biography
The daughter of a Danish mother and a Polish father Richard Cosby (Ryszard Kossobudzki) who came to the United States after World War II, Cosby was born in Brooklyn, New York. She grew up in Greenwich, Connecticut, where she attended Greenwich High School and freelanced for the local paper. She earned her bachelor's degrees from the University of South Carolina. Cosby balanced college with a position at WACH-TV, the local FOX affiliate. After an internship working for Dan Rather on the CBS Evening News, Cosby found work as an anchor/reporter at KERO-TV in Bakersfield, California, and WBTV in Charlotte, North Carolina.

Fox News Channel 
From 1995 to 2005, Cosby worked at Fox News. At Fox, she hosted both The Big Story Weekend Edition with Rita Cosby and Fox News Live with Rita Cosby.

She has interviewed over twenty world leaders, conducting historic back-to-back interviews with Palestinian leader Yasser Arafat and Israeli Prime Minister Ariel Sharon. She was the first reporter to see prisoners held at Guantanamo Bay. She also interviewed Serbian president Slobodan Milošević who called her from his prison cell at the Hague. Years earlier, while broadcasting live from Belgrade during the NATO bombing, she broke the news that three American POWs were going to be released.

Cosby also made national headlines for her interviews with boxer Mike Tyson, singer Michael Jackson and convicted serial killer David Berkowitz, "The Son of Sam," who wrote to her during the Washington, D.C. sniper shootings in October 2002. As that story unfolded, Cosby secured another major first, by reporting the names and license plate numbers of the sniper suspects. In 2001, Cosby's interview with flight attendant Anne Marie Smith led to a U.S. Attorney's Office investigation of Rep. Gary Condit for obstruction of justice and witness tampering.

Cosby served as a lead reporter during the 1996 and 2000 Presidential campaigns. During the Monica Lewinsky investigation, she broke the news that President Bill Clinton was about to be subpoenaed to testify before the grand jury.  After receiving an exclusive letter from Timothy McVeigh, who carried out the Oklahoma City bombing, she was granted a rare meeting with Pope John Paul II to discuss death penalty issues.

MSNBC 
In 2005, Cosby moved to MSNBC to host a primetime weeknight show, Rita Cosby Live & Direct. It became the network's highest-rated show that year, and she did extensive reports for other NBC programs, including The Today Show.  She traveled for the network, originating live for several weeks from New Orleans and the Gulf Coast region to report on Hurricanes Katrina and Rita, as well as from the war zone in Afghanistan and along the U.S.-Mexico border. On February 8, 2007, Cosby broke the news on the death of Anna Nicole Smith. She conducted the last broadcast interview with former Crips gang leader Stanley “Tookie” Williams and was one of a few journalists to witness his execution at San Quentin Prison. Additionally, she conducted rare interviews with Erik Menendez and Dr. Jack Kevorkian, both also behind bars. She left the network in 2007 to pursue other media offers and projects.

Other media activities and appearances
Since 2009, she co-hosts the worldwide broadcast of The National Memorial Day Parade simulcast to all US military installations around the globe. Well known in the Mideast, Cosby also interviewed candidates about foreign policy on Israel's TV show, The Ambassador.  Additionally, Cosby has co-chaired various events internationally, including the Intersec Security Conference in Dubai in 2009. and the Euro-American Women's Council Forum in Greece in 2010. She was selected by Cosmopolitan Magazine as a “Fun and Fearless Female.”

Cosby often fills in for Nancy Grace on the latter's HLN program, and is heard daily on her WOR Radio program called The Rita Cosby Show. Cosby's interviews have included: Jimmy Carter, Dick Cheney, Mitt Romney, Ross Perot, Governor Andrew Cuomo, Mark Burnett and Donald Trump.

Publications
Cosby has authored two books.

Blonde Ambition
On September 4, 2007, Cosby released a book about Anna Nicole Smith, Blonde Ambition: The Untold Story Behind Anna Nicole Smith's Death. The book details the circumstances around the death of the model in 2007.  The book has become a New York Times bestseller. In October  2007, Howard K. Stern, Smith's  former  attorney and  agent   filed a $60 million libel and   defamation lawsuit  against  Cosby and her publisher  for her claims that  Stern and  father of  Smith's daughter  were involved in  homosexual  relationship and that there was a  videotape  of  their alleged  relationship. In July  2009, in a court  hearing  whether to dismiss the lawsuit  Cosby  admitted there was no videotape and could not prove allegations that Stern  was involved  in  criminal activities regarding  Smith's death. New York Federal court judge Denny Chin  ruled that  Cosby's  actions were  extremely  troubling, and suggest she was  attempting  to  obstruct justice by tempering with witnesses. The  defamation lawsuit was  withdrawn and settled  in  November  2009. The terms of   the  settlement were confidential.

Quiet Hero
In 2010, Cosby released a memoir, Quiet Hero: Secrets From My Father’s Past. The book became a best-seller on several lists, including The New York Times, USA Today, and The Washington Post. She uncovered a story of heroism and courage in her own family, detailing her father's youth as a Polish Resistance fighter who battled the Nazis during the Warsaw Uprising in World War II. Senator John McCain called it, “a loving, poignant tribute to her P.O.W. father and freedom.” Former secretary of state Henry Kissinger said it's “a beautiful tribute to the strength of the human spirit.” Lech Wałęsa, former president of Poland, said of Cosby's father, “One of Poland’s great treasures has now been found.”   In 2010, a resolution was passed in the South Carolina Legislature honoring Rita Cosby and her father. The book has raised money for the USO to help wounded soldiers and their families.

References

External links
Quiet Hero website
Quiet Hero book excerpt
Quiet Hero Good Morning America video
Quiet Hero on Extra

1964 births
Living people
American people of Danish descent
American people of Polish descent
American television reporters and correspondents
American television news anchors
American television talk show hosts
People from Brooklyn
Writers from Greenwich, Connecticut
University of South Carolina alumni
American women television journalists
MSNBC people
Journalists from New York City
Greenwich High School alumni